Datana angusii, or Angus's datana moth, is a species of moth in the family Notodontidae (the prominents). It was first described by Augustus Radcliffe Grote and Coleman Townsend Robinson in 1866 and it is found in North America.

The MONA or Hodges number for Datana angusii is 7903.

References

Further reading

External links

 

Notodontidae
Articles created by Qbugbot
Moths described in 1866